Giannis Niarchos (born 26 June 2002) is a Greek professional footballer who plays as a striker for Slovak Fortuna Liga club DAC Dunajská Streda.

References

2002 births
Living people
Association football forwards
Greece youth international footballers
Greek expatriate footballers
Slovak Super Liga players
FK Senica players
FC ViOn Zlaté Moravce players
FC DAC 1904 Dunajská Streda players
Expatriate footballers in Slovakia
Greek expatriate sportspeople in Slovakia
Footballers from Athens
Greek footballers